Paul Hänni (3 October 1914 – 1996) was a Swiss sprinter. He competed in the men's 100 metres at the 1936 Summer Olympics.

Competition record

References

1914 births
1996 deaths
Athletes (track and field) at the 1936 Summer Olympics
Swiss male sprinters
Olympic athletes of Switzerland
Place of birth missing